Myron Kerstein is an American film editor. He was nominated for an Academy Award in the category Best Film Editing for the film Tick, Tick... Boom!.

Selected filmography 
 Black and White (1999)
 Love in the Time of Money (2002)
 Raising Victor Vargas (2002)
 Camp (2003)
 Garden State (2004)
 Chrystal (2004)
 In Good Company (2004)
 The Dukes of Hazzard (2005)
 American Dreamz (2006)
 The Great Buck Howard (2008)
 The Promotion (2008)
 Nick & Norah's Infinite Playlist (2008)
 Fame (2009)
 Little Fockers (2010)
 LOL (2012)
 Movie 43 (2013)
 The English Teacher (2013)
 Paradise (2013)
 Wish I Was Here (2014)
 Going in Style (2017)
 Crazy Rich Asians (2018)
 In the Heights (2021)
 Tick, Tick... Boom! (2021; co-nominated with Andrew Weisblum)

References

External links 

Living people
Year of birth missing (living people)
Place of birth missing (living people)
American film editors